Joe Bourke (8 November 1884 – 28 August 1932) was  a former Australian rules footballer who played with Richmond in the Victorian Football League (VFL).

Notes

External links 

1884 births
1932 deaths
Australian rules footballers from Victoria (Australia)
Richmond Football Club players